Düne (Danish: Dynen, North Frisian: de Halem) is one of two islands in the German Bight that form the Archipelago of Heligoland, the other being Heligoland proper.

Geography
The small island of Düne is part of the German State of Schleswig-Holstein. Situated  to the east of the main island Heligoland, Düne is part of the  Heligoland protected natural area. The island is separated from Heligoland proper by the Rede strait.

History
Until the 17th century, Düne was connected to Heligoland. On New Year's Eve 1721 a big storm surge separated the dunes from Heligoland. Therefore, the island that arose was called Düne (English: Dune). In 1940 the Nazi government 
This increase was for use as a military airfield.

External links
 Düne at the website of Heligoland municipality

Heligoland
Uninhabited islands of Germany